Underhand or underhanded may refer to:

Music
 "Underhand", in the 1986 Throw a Sickie album by Tall Dwarfs
 "Underhand", in the 1974 Somethin's Happening album by Peter Frampton
An underhand grip;
 a type of traditional grip in drumming
 a way of holding the bow when playing string instruments

Sports
 Underhand chop, an event in a lumberjack competition
 Underhand grip in weightlifting
 Underhand pass in volleyball
 Underhand pitch (baseball), a less common type of pitch
 Underhand pitch (softball), the manner of pitching in softball
 Underhand serve (disambiguation), in several sports

See also
 
 

 Underhanded C Contest